Harmsworth may refer to:

People
Harmsworth (surname)

Titles of the Harmsworth family of newspaper proprietors:
Viscount Northcliffe
Viscount Rothermere
Baron Harmsworth

Other
Harmsworth Cup, a trophy for motorboat racing
Vere Harmsworth Library, a research library for U.S. studies at the Rothermere American Institute, University of Oxford
Coram's Fields, officially named "Coram's Fields and the Harmsworth Memorial Playground"
Harmsworth Popular Science, a magazine published in the early 20th century
A. Harmsworth Glacier, N Greenland